Steve Satterfield is a former American football coach and player. He served as the head football coach at Wofford College from 1974 until his retirement in 1976, compiling a record of 18–14–1. As a college football player, he was the starting quarterback at the University of South Carolina in 1959.

References

Year of birth missing (living people)
Living people
American football quarterbacks
Clemson Tigers football coaches
South Carolina Gamecocks football players
Wofford Terriers football coaches
High school football coaches in South Carolina